Wilhelm Moritz (29 June 1913 – 2010) was a Luftwaffe ace and recipient of the Knight's Cross of the Iron Cross during World War II. During his career Wilhelm Moritz was credited with 44 victories in 500+ missions.

Career
Moritz was born on 29 June 1913 in Altona, a borough of Hamburg in the German Empire.

In mid-1940, Moritz was posted to the II. Gruppe (2nd group) of Jagdgeschwader 77 (JG 77—77th Fighter Wing) which at the time was based in Norway and commanded by Hauptmann Karl Hentschel. There, he was assigned to the 4. Staffel (4th squadron) headed by Hauptmann Helmut Henz which was based at Trondheim-Værnes. Moritz claimed his first aerial victory on 6 July 1940 when he shot down a Royal Air Force (RAF) Bristol Blenheim bomber west of Stavanger He shot down another RAF Blenheim bomber on 19 August followed by a Bristol Beaufort torpedo bomber on 26 October. In November 1940, Moritz succeeded Hauptmann Theodor Cammann as Staffelkapitän (squadron leader) of 6. Staffel of JG 77. On 10 November, II. Gruppe was withdrawn from Norway and began relocation to France. In France, the Gruppe was based at Brest-Süd Airfield, also known as Brest Guipavas Airfield, where they patrolled the French Atlantic coast. In January 1941, Moritz was posted to the Jagdfliegerschule 4, the fighter pilot school at Fürth Airfield.

In March 1942, IV. Gruppe of Jagdgeschwader 1 (JG 1–1st Fighter Wing) was re-designated and became the III. Gruppe of Jagdgeschwader 5 (JG 5—5th Fighter Wing). In consequence, Hauptmann Fritz Losigkeit was charged with the creation of a new IV. Gruppe which was initially based at Werneuchen near Berlin. Oberleutnant Friedrich Eberle headed 10. Staffel which had already served as 3. Staffel of Jagdgruppe Losigkeit. The Einsatzstaffel of Jagdfliegerschule 4 under Moritz formed 11. Staffel on 3 April. Oberleutnant Franz Eisenach initially led 12. Staffel created from some pilots of the former IV. Gruppe. Command of 12. Staffel then passed on to Oberleutnant Heinz Stöcker. On 10 September, Moritz was transferred to the Gruppenstab (headquarters unit) of IV. Gruppe of Jagdgeschwader 51 "Mölders" (JG 51—51st Fighter Wing). He was replaced by Oberleutnant Rainer Framm as commander of 11. Staffel of JG 1.

Eastern Front
At the time of his posting to JG 51, IV. Gruppe was based at Novodugino, north of Vyazma on the Eastern Front, and fighting in the Battle of Rzhev. The commander of the Gruppe was Hauptmann Johann Knauth. In October 1942, Moritz was given command of 12. Staffel of JG 51. He succeeded Oberleutnant Egon Falkensamer who was transferred. In October 1943, Moritz was transferred to Jagdgeschwader 3 "Udet" (JG 3—3rd Fighter Wing) where he was given command of 6. Staffel. In consequence, command of 12. Staffel of JG 51 was passed to Leutnant Rudolf Wagner.

Defense of the Reich
On 15 April 1944, Generalmajor Adolf Galland, at the time the General der Jagdflieger (General of Fighters), visited IV. Gruppe of JG 3 at the airfield in Salzwedel. At the time, Moritz served with Gruppenstab of IV. Gruppe. Galland announced that the IV. Gruppe would be converted to a Sturmgruppe (assault group), the first of such units, as a means to combat the bomber formations of the United States Army Air Forces (USAAF). Similar to the experimental Sturmstaffel 1 (1st Assault Squadron) of JG 3, the Gruppe was equipped with the heavily armored variant of the Focke Wulf Fw 190 A series. Every pilot of the Gruppe was asked to sign a contract, declaring that they would commit themselves to pressing attacks on the bombers  to point-blank range, and that aerial ramming should be considered. Three days later, Moritz was officially appointed Gruppenkommandeur (group commander) of the IV. Sturmgruppe of JG 3. He replaced Hauptmann Heinz Lang, who had temporarily led the Gruppe after its former commander, Major Friedrich-Karl Müller was appointed Geschwaderkommodore (wing commander) on 11 April.

Moritz claimed his first aerial victory in Defense of the Reich on 22 April when 803 bombers of the USAAF Eighth Air Force targeted various German transportation targets in western Germany, in particular the railroad classification yard in Hamm. IV. Gruppe was scrambled at 18:20 in Salzwedel and engaged Consolidated B-24 Liberator bombers from the 2nd Air Division at 19:40 in a 20 minute aerial during which Moritz shot down one of the B-24 bombers. On 29 April, 679 USAAF bombers, escorted by 814 fighters, headed von Berlin to bomb the capital. IV. Gruppe flew two missions to defend against this attack. On the second mission, the Gruppe intercepted the bombers on their return from the target area at 13:20 in the vicinity of Gardelegen. In this encounter, Moritz claimed an Herausschuss (separation shot)—a severely damaged heavy bomber forced to separate from his combat box which was counted as an aerial victory—over a B-24 bomber.

On 7 July 1944, a force of 1,129 B-17 Flying Fortresses and B-24 Liberators of the USAAF Eighth Air Force set out from England to bomb aircraft factories in the Leipzig area and the synthetic oil plants at Boehlen, Leuna-Merseburg and Lützkendorf. This formation was intercepted by a German Gefechtsverband (combat formation) consisting of IV. Sturmgruppe of JG 3, led by Hauptmann Moritz, escorted by two Gruppen of Bf 109s from Jagdgeschwader 300 (JG 300—300th Fighter Wing) led by Major Walther Dahl. Dahl and Moritz drove the attack to point-blank range behind the Liberators of the 492d Bombardment Group before opening fire. 492d Bombardment Group was temporarily without fighter cover. Within about a minute the entire squadron of twelve B-24s had been annihilated. The Germans claimed 28 USAAF 2nd Air Division B-24s that day and were credited with at least 21. The majority to the Sturmgruppe attack. This event, also known as the Luftschlacht bei Oschersleben (aerial battle at Oschersleben), earned both Dahl and Moritz a reference in the Wehrmachtbericht, an information bulletin issued by the headquarters of the Wehrmacht, on 8 July. Moritz was awarded the Knight's Cross of the Iron Cross on 18 July for 39 aerial victories, including six Herausschüsse.

On 19 November, IV. The plan was to consolidate all three Gruppen of JG 3 in northwestern Germany which were subordinated to the 3. Jagd Division (3rd Fighter Division) commanded by Generalmajor Walter Grabmann. On the afternoon of 26 November, JG 3 was ordered to take off to attack Allied fighter bombers. While I. Gruppe lost its commander in a takeoff accident, Moritz aircraft got stuck in the mud during taxiing. The mission ended in a fiasco for JG 3 and Moritz was threatened with court-martial. To avoid legal prosecution, Major Heinz Bär, the Geschwaderkommodore of JG 3, had Moritz transferred to IV. Gruppe of Ergänzungs-Jagdgeschwader 1 (EJG 1), a Luftwaffe replacement training unit. Moritz left JG 3 on 5 December and was replaced by Hauptmann Hubert-York Weydenhammer.

Summary of career

Aerial victory claims
Mathews and Foreman, authors of Luftwaffe Aces — Biographies and Victory Claims, researched the German Federal Archives and found records for 41 aerial victory claims, plus three further unconfirmed claims. This figure includes 28 aerial victories on the Eastern Front and 13 over the Western Allies, including nine four-engined bombers.

Victory claims were logged to a map-reference (PQ = Planquadrat), for example "PQ 07671". These sectors were then subdivided into 36 smaller units to give a location area 3 × 4 km in size.

Awards
 Flugzeugführerabzeichen
 Front Flying Clasp of the Luftwaffe
 Iron Cross (1939) 2nd and 1st Class
 Honour Goblet of the Luftwaffe on 11 October 1943 as Hauptmann and Staffelkapitän
 German Cross in Gold in 1945 as Major in the IV./Jagdgeschwader 3
 Knight's Cross of the Iron Cross on 18 July 1944 as Major and Gruppenkommandeur of IV./Jagdgeschwader 3 "Udet"

Notes

References

Citations

Bibliography

 
 
 
 
 
 
 
 
 
 
 
 
 
 
 
 
 

1913 births
2010 deaths
People from Altona, Hamburg
Luftwaffe pilots
German World War II flying aces
Recipients of the Gold German Cross
Recipients of the Knight's Cross of the Iron Cross
People from the Province of Schleswig-Holstein
Military personnel from Hamburg